The Mad Doctor of Market Street is a 1942  American horror film produced by Universal Pictures starring Lionel Atwill. The film was a low-budget project that utilized the studio's contract players and gave rising director Joseph H. Lewis an opportunity to demonstrate his versatility with little production money.

Plot
The mad doctor Benson pays a destitute man $1,000 to be the first human subject of his regeneration experiments. When the man dies, Dr. Benson boards a liner headed to New Zealand to escape police search. The ship catches fire and sinks. In a life boat Benson and five survivors land on a tropical island. He brings the apparently dead wife of the native chief back to life and is pronounced a god by the natives. Benson has the lifeboat burned and tells his fellow survivors he intends to use them as subjects of his further experiments.

Cast
Cast sourced from the American Film Institute and the book Universal Horrors.

Production
The original script for The Mad Doctor of Market Street was written by  Al Martin under the title Terror of the South Seas.  The screenwriter and director Joseph H. Lewis had previously collaborated on Invisible Ghost for Monogram Pictures. When filming began in July 1941, the title changed to Terror of the Islands.

In a 1988 interview, Richard Davies remembered little, and stated that "[ Lionel Atwill ] was the star of the picture and we just had a speaking acquaintance" and that in his opinion "the picture was not as good as the picture I made with Fred Astaire called The Sky's the Limit for RKO."

Release
The Mad Doctor of Market Street premiered in New York in the week of January 4, 1942. It opened wide on February 27, 1942. In early 1942, the film was double featured with The Wolf Man. The film had a pseudo-follow up with Abbott and Costello in Pardon My Sarong.

By 2006, the film was not released on home video in any format. The film was released on DVD on October 7, 2014 by the Willette Acquisition Corp. Along with Murders in the Zoo, The Mad Ghoul and The Strange Case of Doctor Rx, The Mad Doctor of Market Street was released on blu ray as part of Scream! Factory's Universal Horror Collection Volume 2 on July 23, 2019.

Reception
From contemporary reviews, Lee Mortimer of The New York Daily News declared the film to be "on a par with all the other mad doctor mellers which have been shown on the Rialto screen." William Boehnel of The New York World-Telegram called the film "a really bad piece of workmanship" and that it had a "story so bogus, so labored, so dreary, the dialogue is so unfunny and the acting so embarrassing that the whole thing is in a class by itself. Rarely has anything more ponderous or tasteless come out of the film capitol."  A review in Harrison's Reports declared that it was "so ridiculous is the story, and so slow-moving the action, that patrons will be bored instead of excited."

From retrospective reviews, the authors of Universal Horrors declared the film to be "a foolish but occasionally entertaining little time-killer if viewed with low expectations." Hal Erickson of AllMovie  found that "the fact that it was the only Universal horror film directed by cult favorite Joseph H. Lewis, it's a shame that Mad Doctor of Market Street isn't better than it is." and that it was "worth the price of admission for its chilling closing sequence alone."
The film received a two out of four star rating in Leonard Maltin's Classic Movie Guide.

References

Sources

External links

 
 
 

1942 films
1942 horror films
American black-and-white films
Mad scientist films
Universal Pictures films
Films directed by Joseph H. Lewis
1940s English-language films
Films set in San Francisco
American horror films
1940s American films